Maxime Laheurte (born 20 May 1985 in Gérardmer) is a retired French nordic combined athlete who has competed since 2002, including 4 Winter Olympic Games. At the 2010 Winter Olympics, he finished fourth in the 4 x 5 km team and 38th in the 10 km individual large hill event.

Laheurte's best finish at the FIS Nordic World Ski Championships was fourth in the 4 x 5 km team event at Liberec in 2009 while his best individual finish was sixth in the 7.5 km sprint at Sapporo two tears earlier.

His best World Cup finish was third twice, both earned in 2006.

References

External links

1985 births
French male Nordic combined skiers
Living people
Nordic combined skiers at the 2010 Winter Olympics
Nordic combined skiers at the 2014 Winter Olympics
Nordic combined skiers at the 2018 Winter Olympics
Olympic Nordic combined skiers of France
Université Savoie-Mont Blanc alumni
FIS Nordic World Ski Championships medalists in Nordic combined
Sportspeople from Vosges (department)